The huēhuētl  is a percussion instrument from Mexico, used by the Aztecs and other cultures. It is an upright tubular drum made from a wooden body opened at the bottom that stands on three legs cut from its base, with skin stretched over the top. It can be beaten by hand or wood mallet.

Description 
This ancient percussion instrument originated from Mesoamerica and was often used by the Aztecs and Tarascan. The huehuetl were used during festivals such as warrior gatherings. The drum itself is made from hollowed tree trunks and thus, came in different sizes. Carvings of animals, faces or warriors were also often carved into the base of the drum. The skin used for the top of the drum was mainly from ocelots. Currently, there are still groups of musicians who use huehuetls to perform Aztec music.

Terminology

Gallery

See also
Teponaztli

References

Further reading
Coe, Michael D. (2002); Mexico: From the Olmecs to the Aztecs London: Thames and Hudson.

Membranophones
Mexican musical instruments
Mesoamerican musical instruments
Aztec society